Brooke Goldstein is a lawyer who opposes the political claims of Palestinians in relation to the State of Israel. She is the founder and Executive Director of The Lawfare Project.

Early life and education
Goldstein was born and raised in Toronto, Ontario, Canada. She is a graduate of McGill University and the Benjamin N. Cardozo School of Law.

Her grandfather was a commander in a unit of Polish partisans that fought against the Nazis.

Career

The Making of A Martyr
CNN anchor Carol Costello describes Goldstein as "a woman on a mission" who traveled to the West Bank, "as a young law student," to film the 2006 documentary film The Making of A Martyr.  Goldstein produced and directed the film about a Palestinian sixteen-year-old, Hussam Abdo, who was stopped at an Israeli border checkpoint when guards found live explosives wrapped around his body. Goldstein argues that Palestinian activists, by encouraging suicide bombing, abuse the rights of Palestinian children. Goldstein calls the use of children as suicide bombers, "the intentional murder of innocent children."

Goldstein asserts that there are "Muslim children throughout the globe that are being targeted through the internet, through satellite programming, by the religious clerics, by the political leaders to kill themselves as suicide bombers. And it is nothing but a form of child abuse."

Children's Rights Institute
Continuing her work from the film, in 2007 Goldstein founded the Children's Rights Institute, "a non-profit organization that tracks and legally combats violations of children's basic human rights, with a special focus on child suicide-homicide bombers, child soldiers, and the phenomenon of human shields."

The Lawfare Project
Goldstein founded The Lawfare Project in 2010, an American nonprofit advocacy organization based in New York City which serves as a legal think tank and litigation fund to uphold the civil and human rights of the Jewish people and pro-Israel community worldwide.

Goldstein co-authored the 2011 book Lawfare: The War Against Free Speech: A First Amendment Guide for Reporting in an Age of Islamist Lawfare. The book offers advice to journalists about how to protect themselves against what Goldstein and Meyer describe as "'Islamist lawfare,' the use of the law as a weapon of war to silence and punish free speech about militant Islam, terrorism and its sources of financing."

Prior to the Lawfare Project, Goldstein worked for the Middle East Forum for two years, directing the organization's "Legal Project" program, "which arranges pro-bono and reduced rate council for people wrongfully sued for speaking about issues of national security," particularly terrorism and Islamic extremism.

Views 
Goldstein questions the use of the word Palestinian as an ethnic or religious identity as Arab Christians, Arab Muslims, and Jews may be from Palestine along with ethnic Armenians and Druze.  According to her, "[t]here’s no such thing as a Palestinian person."

Media appearances 
Goldstein has been a regular guest on Fox News, including the Fox News programs Hannity and The Kelly File.

In June 2018, Goldstein began hosting the program Outspoken on the Jewish Broadcasting Service (JBS).

Awards and affiliations
Goldstein was the recipient of the Benjamin N. Cardozo School of Law's 2007 E. Nathaniel Gates Award for Outstanding Public Advocacy and the 2009 Inspire! Award.

In 2016, Goldstein was awarded The Blue Card's Irene Hizme Tikkun Olam Award. Goldstein is a Term Member at the Council on Foreign Relations.

References

Living people
Canadian human rights activists
Canadian Jews
Women human rights activists
McGill University alumni
Activists from Toronto
Year of birth missing (living people)